Longevity medicine is advanced personalized preventive medicine driven by deep biomarkers of aging and longevity. The longevity medicine utilizes novel quantifiable and quantifying biomarkers of aging. Biogerontology, geroscience, and precision, preventative, and functional medicine are all fast expanding fields within the topic. The goal of longevity medicine is to use novel quantitative and quantified indicators of aging, such as deep aging clocks, to keep the patient's biological and psychological age as near to peak performance as feasible throughout life.

Evolution of medicine

With recent breakthroughs in artificial intelligence and machine learning, biomarker research and medication development have yielded a plethora of methods for early detection and prevention of communicable and noncommunicable illnesses, many of which are still completely unknown to the worldwide medical community. This ignorance is mostly due to a lack of organized, pedagogically designed instructional resources geared to specific audiences, especially physicians, biotechnologists, and public health experts. Longevity and healthy aging as a key focus for healthcare will surely have a significant influence on primary, secondary, and tertiary prevention.

Classification of aging as a disease

The term "disease" originally meant "loss of ease or comfort." It is now used to describe "an sickness that affects a human, animal, or plant: a condition that hinders the body or mind from functioning correctly." Because of growing health standards and diagnostic capabilities, thought history, what qualifies as a sickness, has experienced a tremendous deal of change. Social and economic factors also have a significant effect. For example, osteoporosis was thought to be an inevitable component of aging until 1994, when the WHO classified it as a disease (WHO, 1994). As a result, those with osteoporosis were no longer deemed 'naturally elderly,' but instead received treatment and expense reimbursement.

Preventive medicine

As new medical technology (vaccination, antibiotics, early diagnostic tools) and greater access to food and water arose during the previous century, life expectancy climbed significantly. Evidence-based medicine has proven enormously beneficial in lowering overall mortality during the last half-century. Nonetheless, because of the increase in lifetime without an increase in health span, the economic burden of sickness has increased. Even at its most refined degree of precision, conventional medicine still evaluates patients based on biological age-correlated characteristics. Individual variations are not taken into account in these reference ranges, which reflect population means. In contrast, longevity (preventive) medicine provides for a more tailored approach by comparing the patient's present status to their peak level of physical fitness. This topic is very new, with notions such as aging clocks first published in 2013 by Steven Horvath et al. (1) and deep aging clocks first published in 2016 by Alex Zhavoronkov et al (2).

Longevity medicine as an AI-powered preventative medicine

Aging and lifespan biomarkers are predictive and prognostic, and there is also data-driven customized prevention. Biomarkers of aging are instruments that may be used to offer a quantitative foundation for assessing the therapeutic success of clinical, health-span-extension therapies. AI-powered longevity medicine will aid in the discovery of drug targets for specific individuals, the identification of tailored geroprotective interventions and aging and longevity biomarkers to improve the study of disease trajectories, and the identification of interventions that may help slow or even reverse aging-associated biological, physiological, or psychological processes.

Aging clocks

Steven Horvath was the first to publish the first multi-tissue Methylation Aging Clock in 2013. The model calculates the pace at which an individual's methylome ages, and we show that gender and genetic variations have an influence. The DNA-methylation age clock, also known as the Epigenetic clock, measures how old a person is based on DNA methylation. Deep Learning (DL) enables the training of deep neural networks (DNNs) on enormous longitudinal data sets, and the first aging clock study employing DNNs was published in 2016 by Zhavoronkov's group. There is no agreement on how to define human 'biological age,' but it is usually used to refer to a measure that is more predictive of mortality, diseases, or frailty than chronological age, and that changes in response to geroprotective interventions and can track some of the biological hallmarks of aging. Clinical applications for aging clocks include assisting physicians in better analyzing biological age.

References 

Ageing
Life extension